You Can't Be President: The Outrageous Barriers to Democracy in America (2008) is the third book by journalist and Harper's Magazine president John R. MacArthur. It largely concerns the influence of money and class on the American political process.

External links
Rick MacArthur: You Can't Be President Democracy Now! August 25, 2008
You Can't Be President The Brian Lehrer Show September 10, 2008
San Francisco Chronicle Review September 7, 2008
Publishers Weekly Review Week of July 14, 2008

2008 non-fiction books
Books about democracy
Books about politics of the United States